Cedric Z. Ceballos (born August 2, 1969) is an American former professional basketball player. As a small forward, he played mostly for the Phoenix Suns and the Los Angeles Lakers, later finishing his National Basketball Association (NBA) career with the Dallas Mavericks, Detroit Pistons and Miami Heat.

Playing career
Ceballos attended college at Ventura College and later Cal State Fullerton.

His career highlights include winning the NBA Slam Dunk Contest with a blindfolded dunk in 1992. He also led the NBA in field goal percentage (57.6) in 1992–93 with the Suns. Ceballos played a major role for the Suns during the playoffs, leading the team to a Western Conference Finals Game 1 win over the Seattle SuperSonics with a team high 21 points. After beating Seattle in a seven game series, the Suns reached the Finals, before losing to the Chicago Bulls. He also led the Lakers in scoring in 1994–95 with a 21.7 average and made the All-Star team, but couldn't participate due to an injury. That season, on December 20, 1994, Ceballos set a career high with 50 points scored, including a 3-point shot to secure the win with 5.7 seconds left, in a game against the Minnesota Timberwolves. The following season, on December 3, 1995, Ceballos recorded a career high 6 steals, along with scoring 19 points, in a 104-96 win over the Indiana Pacers. That year, Ceballos again led the Lakers with a 21.2 scoring average.

In 2002, Ceballos signed with Israeli team Hapoel Tel Aviv, but was waived after a couple of games. Shortly after, he moved to Russia and was signed by BC Lokomotiv Mineralnye Vody. He also played for the San Miguel Beermen in the Philippine Basketball Association (PBA).

In late 2004, he signed with the Los Angeles Stars from the ABA.
Ceballos later became employed by the Phoenix Suns as their in-arena emcee and host of a weekly webcast, "Nothin' but Net".  He also hosted a morning music program for Phoenix, Arizona rhythm & blues radio station MEGA 104.3 FM.

In March 2007, the Phoenix Flame of the IBL announced the signing of Ceballos for its inaugural season in the league, but he quickly moved behind the lines as an assistant coach the next month.

Ceballos has toured with the "USA Legends". On June 19, 2011, the USA Legends defeated the Indonesian NBL All Star team 97–79, with Ceballos being the unofficial MVP of the game. A notable highlight of Ceballos' performance during the game was when he donned one of the Indonesian player's jerseys and player for the Indonesian team over a stretch of a few possessions, scoring a breakaway dunk during one of them.

Ceballos later became part owner of the American Basketball Association's Arizona Scorpions, and also played for the team.

Personal life
Ceballos was invited to play for the Mexico national basketball team in the 1992 Summer Olympics. He is also a second cousin of his former Lakers teammate Kobe Bryant. Their grandfathers were brothers.

In 2011, Ceballos suffered "a series of small heart attacks", as described by his publicist. He successfully recovered by undergoing an angioplasty with two stents placed in his heart.

In 2021, he contracted COVID-19 and posted photos of himself in the intensive care unit. On September 13, he tweeted that he was free of COVID-19, but was still having difficulty breathing and walking.

In media
In 1996, Ceballos made a guest appearance on the PBS children's series The Puzzle Place. The following year, he played himself on an episode of Living Single titled "High Anxiety". 

In 1998, Ceballos was a guest panelist on the Nickelodeon game show Figure It Out.

Ceballos also worked on the album titled B-Ball's Best Kept Secret, a 1994 record featuring tracks of an array of early 1990s NBA players. He is featured on multiple tracks performing with hip-hop star Warren G on "Flow On" and later on the track "Ya Don't Stop" also featuring fellow NBA All-Star Dana Barros and rappers Grand Puba, Sadat X, AG and Diamond D.

Ceballos appeared along with Shawn Marion in the 30th season of The Amazing Race. They finished in ninth place, having raced a total of four legs.

NBA career statistics

Regular season 

|-
| style="text-align:left;"| 
| style="text-align:left;"|Phoenix
| 63 || 0 || 11.6 || .487 || .167 || .663 || 2.4 || 0.6 || 0.2 || 0.1 || 8.2
|-
| style="text-align:left;"| 
| style="text-align:left;"|Phoenix
| 64 || 4 || 11.3 || .482 || .167 || .736 || 2.4 || 0.8 || 0.3 || 0.2 || 7.2
|-
| style="text-align:left;"| 
| style="text-align:left;"|Phoenix
| 74 || 46 || 21.7 ||style="background:#cfecec;"| .576* || .000 || .725 || 5.5 || 1.0 || 0.7 || 0.4 || 12.8
|-
| style="text-align:left;"| 
| style="text-align:left;"|Phoenix
| 53 || 43 || 30.2 || .535 || .000 || .724 || 6.5 || 1.7 || 1.1 || 0.4 || 19.1
|-
| style="text-align:left;"| 
| style="text-align:left;"|L.A. Lakers
| 58 || 54 || 35.0 || .509 || .397 || .716 || 8.0 || 1.8 || 1.0 || 0.3 || 21.7
|-
| style="text-align:left;"| 
| style="text-align:left;"|L.A. Lakers
| 78 || 71 || 33.7 || .530 || .277 || .804 || 6.9 || 1.5 || 1.2 || 0.3 || 21.2
|-
| style="text-align:left;"| 
| style="text-align:left;"|L.A. Lakers
| 8 || 8 || 34.9 || .410 || .238 || .867 || 6.6 || 1.9 || 0.6 || 0.8 || 10.8
|-
| style="text-align:left;"| 
| style="text-align:left;"|Phoenix
| 42 || 32 || 27.3 || .464 || .259 || .737 || 6.6 || 1.2 || 0.7 || 0.4 || 15.3
|-
| style="text-align:left;"| 
| style="text-align:left;"|Phoenix
| 35 || 16 || 17.9 || .500 || .300 || .714 || 4.3 || 1.0 || 0.6 || 0.2 || 9.5
|-
| style="text-align:left;"| 
| style="text-align:left;"|Dallas
| 12 || 9 || 30.3 || .478 || .300 || .770 || 6.0 || 2.1 || 0.9 || 0.7 || 16.9
|-
| style="text-align:left;"| 
| style="text-align:left;"|Dallas
| 13 || 5 || 27.1 || .421 || .393 || .694 || 6.5 || 0.9 || 0.5 || 0.4 || 12.5
|-
| style="text-align:left;"| 
| style="text-align:left;"|Dallas
| 69 || 25 || 29.9 || .446 || .328 || .843 || 6.7 || 1.3 || 0.8 || 0.3 || 16.6
|-
| style="text-align:left;"| 
| style="text-align:left;"|Detroit
| 13 || 0 || 12.8 || .394 || .275 || .800 || 2.0 || 0.5 || 0.5 || 0.2 || 5.8
|-
| style="text-align:left;"| 
| style="text-align:left;"|Miami
| 27 || 0 || 14.6 || .462 || .333 || .879 || 3.0 || 0.5 || 0.4 || 0.1 || 6.9
|- class="sortbottom"
| style="text-align:center;" colspan="2"| Career
| 609 || 313 || 24.2 || .500 || .309 || .753 || 5.3 || 1.2 || 0.7 || 0.3 || 14.3

Playoffs 

|-
|style="text-align:left;"|1991
|style="text-align:left;”|Phoenix
|3||0||8.0||.583||–||.333||1.7||0.7||0.7||0.0||5.3
|-
|style="text-align:left;"|1992
|style="text-align:left;”|Phoenix
|8||8||23.5||.550||–||.667||6.4||1.5||0.8||0.8||13.5
|-
|style="text-align:left;"|1993
|style="text-align:left;”|Phoenix
|16||3||11.6||.571||–||.727||2.3||0.8||0.3||0.4||6.0
|-
|style="text-align:left;"|1994
|style="text-align:left;”|Phoenix
|10||8||21.2||.462||.000||.833||4.4||0.8||0.8||0.2||10.1
|-
|style="text-align:left;"|1995
|style="text-align:left;”|L.A. Lakers
|10||10||34.0||.381||.360||.737||6.1||1.8||1.2||0.7||14.2
|-
|style="text-align:left;"|1996
|style="text-align:left;”|L.A. Lakers
|4||4||35.5||.484||.313||.917||8.3||1.3||1.0||0.3||19.0
|-
|style="text-align:left;"|1997
|style="text-align:left;”|Phoenix
|5||0||21.4||.333||.250||1.000||5.2||0.6||0.8||0.6||6.6
|-
|style="text-align:left;"|2001
|style="text-align:left;”|Miami
|3||0||5.0||.286||–||.500||2.0||0.3||0.0||0.0||1.7
|- class="sortbottom"
| style="text-align:center;" colspan="2"| Career
| 59 || 33 || 20.6 || .466 || .325 || .743 || 4.5 || 1.1 || 0.7 || 0.4 || 9.8

References

External links
 NBA.com Profile

 Nothin' But Net
 Cedric the Entertainer
 Arizona Scorpions profile

1969 births
Living people
African-American basketball players
American expatriate basketball people in Israel
American expatriate basketball people in the Philippines
American expatriate basketball people in Russia
American sportspeople of Mexican descent
Basketball players from Hawaii
Cal State Fullerton Titans men's basketball players
Dallas Mavericks players
Detroit Pistons players
Hapoel Tel Aviv B.C. players
Harlem Globetrotters players
Israeli Basketball Premier League players
Los Angeles Lakers players
Miami Heat players
National Basketball Association All-Stars
People from Maui
Philippine Basketball Association imports
Phoenix Suns draft picks
Phoenix Suns players
San Miguel Beermen players
Small forwards
The Amazing Race (American TV series) contestants
Ventura Pirates men's basketball players
American men's basketball players